The Ilyushin Il-106 was a proposed 1990s Russian heavy military transport to replace the Il-76. It would have been a four-engined high-wing cantilever monoplane with a large 34 m (111 ft 7 in) cabin.

In 2016 it was announced that the Il-106 airframe would be re-used for the PAK VTA project, a proposed large military transport aircraft for the Russian Air Force.

Specifications

See also

References

Notes

Bibliography

External links
Il-106 on Global Security

Il-108
1990s Soviet and Russian military transport aircraft
Abandoned military aircraft projects of the Soviet Union